Zinder IV is an urban commune in Niger. It is a commune of the city of Zinder.

References

Zinder
Communes of Niger